The Never Trump movement, also called the #nevertrump, Stop Trump, anti-Trump, or Dump Trump movement, began as an effort on the part of a group of Republicans (known as Never Trump Republicans) and other prominent conservatives to prevent Republican front-runner Donald Trump from obtaining the Republican Party presidential nomination. After he was nominated, this shifted into an effort to prevent him from obtaining the presidency in the 2016 United States presidential election. Trump remained unsupported by 20 percent of Republican members of Congress in the general election. Following Trump's election in November 2016, some in the movement refocused their efforts on defeating Trump in 2020.

Trump entered the Republican primaries on June 16, 2015, at a time when governors Jeb Bush and Scott Walker and Senator Marco Rubio were viewed as early frontrunners. Trump was considered a longshot to win the nomination, but his large media profile gave him a chance to spread his message and appear in the Republican debates. By the end of 2015, Trump was leading the Republican field in national polls. At this point, some Republicans, such as former Mitt Romney adviser Alex Castellanos, called for a "negative ad blitz" against Trump and another former Romney aide founded Our Principles PAC to attack Trump.

After Trump won the New Hampshire and South Carolina primaries, many Republican leaders called for the party to unite around a single leader to stop Trump's nomination. The Never Trump movement gained momentum following Trump's wins in the March 15, 2016, Super Tuesday primaries, including his victory over Rubio in Florida. After Senator Ted Cruz dropped out of the race following Trump's primary victory in Indiana on May 3, 2016, Trump became the presumptive nominee while internal opposition to Trump remained as the process pivoted towards a general election.

Following unsuccessful attempts by some delegates at the Republican National Convention to block his nomination, Trump became the Republican Party's 2016 nominee for president on July 18, 2016. Some members of the Never Trump movement endorsed alternative candidates in the general election, such as Democratic nominee Hillary Clinton, Libertarian nominee Gary Johnson, independent conservative Evan McMullin and American Solidarity Party nominee Mike Maturen.

Some have compared the Never Trump movement to the Mugwumps, Republicans in the 1884 United States presidential election who refused to back party nominee James G. Blaine and instead threw support for Democratic candidate Grover Cleveland.

Erickson meeting 

On March 17, 2016, anti-Trump conservatives met at the Army and Navy Club in Washington, D.C., to discuss strategies for preventing Trump from securing the presidential nomination at the Republican National Convention in July. Among the strategies discussed were a "unity ticket", a possible third-party candidate and a contested convention, especially if Trump did not gain the 1,237 delegates necessary to secure the nomination.

The meeting was organized by Erick Erickson, Bill Wichterman and Bob Fischer. Around two dozen people attended. Consensus was reached that Trump's nomination could be prevented and that efforts would be made to seek a unity ticket, possibly comprising Cruz and Ohio governor John Kasich.

Efforts

By political organizations 

Our Principles PAC and Club for Growth were involved in trying to prevent Trump's nomination. Our Principles PAC spent more than $13 million on advertising attacking Trump. The Club for Growth spent $11 million in an effort to prevent Trump from becoming the Republican Party's nominee.

By Republican delegates 

In June 2016, activists Eric O'Keefe and Dane Waters formed a group called Delegates Unbound, which CNN described as "an effort to convince delegates that they have the authority and the ability to vote for whomever they want". The effort involved the publication of a book titled Unbound: The Conscience of a Republican Delegate by Republican delegates Curly Haugland and Sean Parnell. The book argues that "delegates are not bound to vote for any particular candidate based on primary and caucus results, state party rules, or even state law".

Republican delegates Kendal Unruh and Steve Lonegan led an effort among fellow Republican delegates to change the convention rules "to include a 'conscience clause' that would allow delegates bound to Trump to vote against him, even on the first ballot at the July convention". Unruh described the effort as "an 'Anybody but Trump' movement". Unruh's efforts started with a conference call on June 16 "with at least 30 delegates from 15 states". Regional coordinators for the effort were recruited in Arizona, Iowa, Louisiana, Washington and other states. By June 19, hundreds of delegates to the Republican National Convention calling themselves Free the Delegates had begun raising funds and recruiting members in support of an effort to change party convention rules to free delegates to vote however they want, instead of according to the results of state caucuses and primaries. Unruh, a member of the convention's Rules Committee and one of the group's founders, planned to propose adding the "conscience clause" to the convention's rules, effectively unhinging pledged delegates. She needed 56 other supporters from the 112-member panel, which determines precisely how Republicans select their nominee in Cleveland. The Rules Committee instead voted 87–12 to adopt rules requiring delegates to vote based on their states' primary and caucus results.

By individuals 

At a luncheon in February 2016 attended by Republican governors and donors, Karl Rove discussed the danger of Trump's securing the Republican nomination by July, and that it might be possible to stop him but there was not much time left.

Early in March 2016, Romney, the 2012 Republican presidential nominee, directed some of his advisors to look at ways to stop Trump from obtaining the nomination at the Republican National Convention (RNC). Romney also gave a major speech urging voters to vote for the Republican candidate most likely to prevent Trump from acquiring delegates in state primaries. A few weeks later, Romney announced that he would vote for Ted Cruz in the Utah GOP caucuses. On his Facebook page, he posted: "Today, there is a contest between Trumpism and Republicanism. Through the calculated statements of its leader, Trumpism has become associated with racism, misogyny, bigotry, xenophobia, vulgarity and, most recently, threats and violence. I am repulsed by each and every one of these". Nevertheless, Romney said early on he would "support the Republican nominee", though he did not "think that's going to be Donald Trump".

Senator Lindsey Graham shifted from opposing both Ted Cruz and Trump to eventually supporting Cruz as a better alternative to Trump. Commenting about Trump, Graham said: "I don't think he's a Republican, I don't think he's a conservative, I think his campaign's built on xenophobia, race-baiting and religious bigotry. I think he'd be a disaster for our party and as Senator Cruz would not be my first choice, I think he is a Republican conservative who I could support". After Trump became the presumptive nominee in May, Graham announced he would not be supporting Trump in the general election, stating: "[I] cannot, in good conscience, support Donald Trump because I do not believe he is a reliable Republican conservative nor has he displayed the judgment and temperament to serve as Commander in Chief". Over the course of the Trump presidency, however, Graham became one of Trump's most ardent supporters in the Senate.

In October 2016, some individuals made third-party vote trading mobile applications and websites to help stop Trump. For example, a Californian who wants to vote for Clinton will instead vote for Jill Stein and in exchange a Stein supporter in a swing state will vote for Clinton. The Ninth Circuit Court of Appeals in the 2007 case Porter v. Bowen established vote trading as a First Amendment right.

Republican former presidents George H. W. Bush and George W. Bush both refused to support Trump in the general election, with the elder Bush reportedly voting for Trump's rival Hillary Clinton.

Republicans who left the party in opposition to the Trump administration 

Several prominent Republicans have left the party in opposition to actions taken by the Trump administration.
 Joe Scarborough (host of Morning Joe)
 George Will (conservative columnist)
 Max Boot (conservative columnist)
 Richard Painter (Bush ethics lawyer)
 Steve Schmidt (Republican Party strategist and top George W. Bush aide)
 Jennifer Rubin (author of the "Right Turn" blog for The Washington Post)
Colin Powell (Former United States Secretary of State) 
Joe Walsh (former representative and radio host)
Wayne Gilchrest (former representative)

Reactions 
Reactions to the Stop Trump movement were mixed, with other prominent Republicans making statements in support of preventing Trump from receiving the Republican nomination. Following his withdrawal as a candidate for president, Senator Marco Rubio expressed hope that Trump's nomination could be stopped, adding that his nomination "would fracture the party and be damaging to the conservative movement".

Republican National Committee chairman Reince Priebus dismissed the potential impact of Mitt Romney's efforts to block Trump at the convention. Sam Clovis, a national co-chairman for Trump's campaign, said he would leave the Republican Party if it "comes into that convention and jimmies with the rules and takes away the will of the people". Ned Ryun, founder of conservative group American Majority, expressed concern about a contested convention, should Trump have the most delegates, but fail to reach the 1,237 necessary to be assured the nomination. Ryun speculated that a contested convention would result in Trump running as a third-party candidate, making it unlikely that Republicans would win the presidency in the November general election, adding that it would "blow up the party, at least in the short term".

New Jersey Governor Chris Christie expressed his opinion that efforts to stop Trump would ultimately fail. Relatively shortly after his endorsement of Trump, he criticized the people who condemned his endorsement, including the Stop Trump movement, saying his critics had yet to support any of the remaining Republican candidates. "I think if you're a public figure, you have the obligation to speak out, and be 'for' something, not just 'against' something. ... When those folks in the 'Stop Trump' movement actually decide to be for something, then people can make an evaluation ... if they want to be for one of the remaining candidates, do what I did: be for one of the remaining candidates."

Trump said if he were deprived of the nomination because of falling just short of the 1,237 delegates required, there could be "problems like you've never seen before. I think bad things would happen" and "I think you'd have riots". Trump made prior comments suggesting that he might run as an independent candidate if he were not to get the Republican nomination.

Roger Stone, a political consultant who served as an advisor for Trump's 2016 presidential campaign and who remains a "confidant" to Trump, put together a group called Stop the Steal and threatened "days of rage" if Republican Party leaders tried to deny the nomination to Trump at the Republican National Convention in Cleveland. Stone also threatened to disclose to the public the hotel room numbers of delegates who opposed Trump.

In 2019, Kelly A. Hyman, wrote the book Top Ten Reasons to Dump Trump in 2020 during the continuation of Never Trump movement, where the reasons voiced during the movement in 2016 - 2019 are collected. Following Trump's election in November 2016, some in the movement refocused their efforts on defeating Trump in 2020.

General election opposition 

Trump was widely described as the presumptive Republican nominee after the May3 Indiana primary, notwithstanding the continued opposition of groups such as Our Principles PAC. Many Republican leaders endorsed Trump after he became the presumptive nominee, but other Republicans looked for ways to defeat him in the general election. Stop Trump members such as Mitt Romney, Erick Erickson, William Kristol, Mike Murphy, Stuart Stevens and Rick Wilson pursued the possibility of an independent candidacy by a non-Trump Republican. Potential candidates included Senator Ben Sasse, Governor John Kasich, Senator Tom Coburn, Congressman Justin Amash, Senator Rand Paul, retired Marine Corps General James Mattis, lawyer Kelly A. Hyman, retired Army General Stanley McChrystal, former Secretary of State Condoleezza Rice, businessman Mark Cuban and 2012 Republican nominee Mitt Romney. However, many of these candidates rejected the possibility of an independent run, pointing to difficulties such as ballot access and the potential to help the Democratic candidate win the presidency. One potential strategy would involve an independent candidate gaining enough electoral votes to deny a majority to either of the major party candidates, sending the three presidential candidates with the most electoral votes to the House of Representatives under procedures established by the Twelfth Amendment. Some anti-Trump Republicans said they would vote for Hillary Clinton in the general election.

On May 3, 2016, one of the biggest anti-Trump groups, the Never Trump PAC, circulated a petition to collect the signatures of conservatives opposed to voting for Trump in the 2016 presidential election. As of August 19, 2016, over 54,000 people had signed the petition. Gary Johnson's campaign in the Libertarian Party attracted attention as a possible vehicle for the Stop Trump movement's votes in the general election after Trump became the Republican Party's presumptive nominee. In late May, Craig Snyder, a former Republican staffer, launched the Republicans for Hillary PAC, "aimed at convincing Republicans to choose Hillary Clinton over ... Donald Trump in November". The grassroots effort, called Republicans for Clinton in 2016, or R4C16, also joined the effort in defeating Trump.

William Kristol, editor of The Weekly Standard, promoted National Review staff writer David A. French of Tennessee as a prospective candidate. However, French opted not to run. On August 8, Evan McMullin, a conservative Republican, announced that he would mount an independent bid for president with support of the Never Trump movement. McMullin was backed by Better for America (a Never Trump group) and supported by former Americans Elect CEO Kahlil Byrd and Republican campaign finance lawyer Chris Ashby.

Developments following the 2016 election 

Although Trump's campaign drew a substantial amount of criticism, Trump received 90 percent of the Republican vote, while Clinton won 89 percent of Democratic voters.

After Trump won the election, two Electoral College electors launched an effort to convince fellow electors who were allocated to Trump to vote against him.

On December 11, Jim Himes, a Democratic member of the House of Representatives, wrote on Twitter that the Electoral College should not elect Trump: "We're 5wks from Inauguration & the President Elect is completely unhinged. The Electoral College must do what it was designed for". In a December 12 interview on CNN's New Day, Himes said he was troubled by several actions by the President-elect. The issue that "pushed [him] over the edge" was Trump's criticism of the CIA and the intelligence community. The Congressman did admit Trump won "fair and square", but he said that Trump proved himself unfit for public office. He cited the intentions behind the creation of the Electoral College and argued that it was created for an instance such as the election of Trump.

In the end, efforts to persuade more electors to vote against Trump ultimately failed and Trump won 304 electors on December 19. Trump's electoral lead over Clinton even grew because a larger number of electors defected from her: Trump received 304 of his 306 pledged electors, Clinton 227 of her 232.

In a National Review article titled "Never Trump Nevermore", Jonah Goldberg stated:
I'm going to call 'em like I see 'em and wait and see if I was wrong about Trump. ... The thing is: Never Trump is over. Never Trump was about the GOP primary and the general election, not the presidency. The Left wants to claim it must be a permanent movement, denying the legitimacy of Trump's election forever, or we were never serious. Well, that's not what we—or at least I—signed up for. ... I'll say it again: I'm going to call 'em like I see 'em and wait and see if I was wrong about Trump. So far, I've said that most of his cabinet picks have been a pleasant and welcome surprise. But he's also done plenty of things that make me feel like I had him pegged all along. We only have one president at a time—and the guy isn't even president yet. I'll give him a chance. But I won't lie for him either.

Since the election, other Republicans who had resisted Trump's candidacy, such as South Carolina Senator Lindsey Graham have since declared their support for his presidency. Since taking office, Trump's job approval among self-described Republicans has been consistently at or near 90 percent.

As the impeachment inquiry against Donald Trump was ongoing, Trump has publicly characterized the witnesses in the inquiry as Never Trumpers in an effort to discredit them. In unsubstantiated statements, he has also specifically accused Ambassador to Ukraine William Taylor, National Security Council official Lt. Col. Alexander Vindman, Deputy Assistant Secretary of State for European and Eurasian Affairs George Kent, and State Department official Jennifer Williams of being Never Trumpers. When asked by Democratic House Representatives during the public impeachment hearings, George Kent, William Taylor, former Ambassador Marie Yovanovitch, Lt. Col. Alexander Vindman, and Jennifer Williams all rejected the notion that they themselves were Never Trumpers.

On October 23, 2019, Trump addressed the Never Trump Republicans on his Twitter account with the following tweet: "The Never Trumper Republicans, though on respirators with not many left, are in certain ways worse and more dangerous for our Country than the Do Nothing Democrats. Watch out for them, they are human scum!"

In 2019, former North Carolina Supreme Court Justice Robert F. Orr co-founded the National Republicans, who support the views of Ronald Reagan and George H. W. Bush.

Evan McMullin, who ran for president in 2016, started the group Republicans for a New President, which held The Convention on Founding Principles at the same time as the 2020 Republican National Convention. The alternative event, which included principal members of Republicans for the Rule of Law and The Lincoln Project, was primarily a virtual event due to the COVID-19 pandemic.

See also 
 43 Alumni for Biden
 List of former Trump administration officials who endorsed Joe Biden
 List of Republicans who opposed the Donald Trump 2020 presidential campaign
 List of Trump administration appointees who endorsed Joe Biden
 REPAIR
 Republican Voters Against Trump
 Right Side PAC
 The Bulwark
 The Resistance

References

External links

 
Donald Trump 2016 presidential campaign
Donald Trump 2020 presidential campaign